The Graphic was a British weekly illustrated newspaper, first published on 4 December 1869 by William Luson Thomas's company Illustrated Newspapers Ltd. Thomas's brother Lewis Samuel Thomas was a co-founder. The premature death of the latter in 1872 "as one of the founders of this newspaper, [and who] took an active interest in its management" left a marked gap in the early history of the publication. It was set up as a rival to the popular Illustrated London News.

The influence of The Graphic within the art world was immense, its many admirers included Vincent van Gogh, and Hubert von Herkomer.

It continued to be published weekly under this title until 23 April 1932 and then changed title to The National Graphic between 28 April and 14 July 1932; it then ceased publication, after 3,266 issues. From 1890 until 1926, Luson Thomas's company,  H. R. Baines & Co., published The Daily Graphic.

Background

The Graphic was founded by William Luson Thomas, a successful artist, wood-engraver and social reformer. Earlier he, his brother and his brother-in-law had been persuaded to go to New York and assist in launching two newspapers, Picture Gallery and Republic. Thomas also had an engraving establishment of his own and, aided by a large staff, illustrated and engraved numerous standard works. Exasperated, even angered, by the unsympathetic treatment of artists by the world's most successful illustrated paper, The Illustrated London News, and having a good business sense Luson Thomas resolved to set up an opposition. His illustrated paper, despite being more expensive than its competition, became an immediate success.

Realisation
When it began in 1869, the newspaper was printed in a rented house. By 1882, the company owned three buildings and twenty printing presses, and employed more than 1,000 people. The first editor was Henry Sutherland Edwards. A successful artist himself, the founder Thomas recruited gifted artists including Luke Fildes, Hubert von Herkomer, Frank Holl, and John Everett Millais.

The Graphic was published on a Saturday and its original cover price was sixpence, while the Illustrated London News was fivepence. In its first year, it described itself to advertisers as "a superior illustrated weekly newspaper, containing twenty-four pages imperial folio, printed on fine toned paper of beautiful quality, made expressly for the purpose and admirably adapted for the display of engravings".

In addition to its home market the paper had subscribers all around the British Empire and North America. The Graphic covered home news and news from around the Empire, and devoted much attention to literature, arts, sciences, the fashionable world, sport, music and opera. Royal occasions and national celebrations and ceremonials were also given prominent coverage.

Artists
Artists employed on The Graphic and The Daily Graphic at the end of the 19th century and beginning of the 20th century included Helen Allingham, Edmund Blampied, Alexander Boyd, Frank Brangwyn, Randolph Caldecott, Lance Calkin Léon Daviel, John Charles Dollman, James H. Dowd, Godefroy Durand, Luke Fildes, Harry Furniss, John Percival Gülich, George du Maurier, Phil May, George Percy Jacomb-Hood, Ernest Prater, Leonard Raven-Hill, Sidney Sime, Snaffles (Charles Johnson Payne), George Stampa, Edmund Sullivan, Bert Thomas, F. H. Townsend, Harrison Weir, and Henry Woods.

The notable illustrator Henry William Brewer, contributed a regular illustrated article on architecture to the magazine for 25 years, until his death in 1903.

Writers
Writers for the paper included George Eliot, Thomas Hardy, H. Rider Haggard and Anthony Trollope.
Malcolm Charles Salaman was employed there from 1890 to 1899. Beatrice Grimshaw travelled the South Pacific reporting on her experiences for the Daily Graphic. Mary Frances Billington served the Graphic as a special correspondent from 1890 to 1897, reporting from India in essays that were compiled into Woman in India (1895). Joseph Ashby-Sterry wrote the Bystander column for the paper for 18 years.

Weekly topics
 Topics of the Week: 12 paragraphs of news coverage.
 Amusements: A roundup of activities for the week, for the middle-class reader.
 Our illustrations: a summary of all the illustrations in the edition.
 Home: a summary of the news in Britain.
 Church news
 Legal: Trials and Cases of interest to the target reader.
 A weekly serial written by popular authors of the time, such as William Black (although this seemed to appear in the 1880s).
 Book reviews
 A summary of the new developments in science.
 Rural notes: information about the season and tips about crops, and other news concerning the rampant unrest of the farm labourers.
 New Music: Reviews of the latest music and musicals.
 Obituaries: of Church leaders, factory owners, European Royalty, musicians and noteworthy Victorians.
 Sport: coverage of football and cricket (with W.G. Grace)
 Motoring: c. 1903–1908 Dorothy Levitt, The Fastest Girl on Earth, wrote a column on motoring from the point of view of 'A woman's right to motor'. A collection of her articles formed the basis of the book The Woman and the Car: A chatty little handbook for all women who motor or who want to motor in 1907/9.

There were at least three pages dedicated to advertising, with many adverts for toothpaste, soap products and 'miracle-cure' pills.

Innovations
The Graphic was designed to compete with the Illustrated London News (established in 1842), and became its most successful rival. Earlier rivals such as the Illustrated Times and the Pictorial Times had either failed to compete or been merged with the ILN. It appealed to the same middle-class readership, but The Graphic, as its name suggests, was intended to use images in a more vivid and striking way than the rather staid ILN. To this end it employed some of the most important artists of the day, making an immediate splash in 1869 with Houseless and Hungry, Luke Fildes' dramatic image of the shivering London poor seeking shelter in a workhouse.

It is much more difficult to produce and print illustrations than type. Improvements in process work and machinery at the end of the 1880s allowed Luson Thomas to realise a long-cherished project, a daily illustrated paper.

The Daily Graphic
On 4 January 1890, Luson Thomas's company, H. R. Baines & Co., commenced publication of the first daily illustrated newspaper in England, which was called The Daily Graphic.
It was published until 16 October 1926, when it was incorporated with the Daily Sketch.

Demise
Luson Thomas's seventh son George Holt Thomas was a director of the newspaper company and became general manager. Holt Thomas founded The Bystander and later Empire Illustrated before abandoning newspapers in 1906 and making a greater name for himself in the aviation industry.

On 15 August 1932, Time magazine reported the name change to The National Graphic and editor William Comyns Beaumont of The Bystander took over, replacing Alan John Bott.

References

Mitchell's Newspaper Press Directory, 1870
The Reference Specialist British Library Newspapers

Further reading
Law, Graham. Indexes to Fiction in The Illustrated London News (1842–1901) and the Graphic, (1869–1901). Victorian Fiction Research Guides 29, Victorian Fiction Research Unit, Department of English, University of Queensland, 2001.
Waterloo Directory of English Newspapers and Periodicals 1800–1900 (Canada: North Waterloo Academic Press, 2003)
The Newspaper Press in Britain: an annotated bibliography (London:Mansell Publishing, 1987).

External links

A history of The Graphic newspaper & staff, with image of the paper's engraving room in 1882.
Publication dates (British Library website)
The Graphic archives at HathiTrust

1869 establishments in the United Kingdom
1932 disestablishments in the United Kingdom
Defunct newspapers published in the United Kingdom
Defunct weekly newspapers
Publications established in 1869
Publications disestablished in 1932